Aleksandra Eduardovna Shchekoldina (born 11 July 2002) is a retired Russian artistic gymnast. She is the 2016 Russian national junior champion in vault and silver medalist in the team competition, in all-around, and on beam.

Gymnastics career

2019
Shchekoldina was named to Russia's team for the 2019 European games alongside Angelina Melnikova and Anastasia Iliankova. In the qualification round, Shchekoldina competed on all four events and qualified to the all-around final in ninth with a total score of 51.565. In the final, she totaled a 52.365 and finished in fifth.

In July, Shchekoldina went to train in Tokyo for a week with the Russian national team in preparation for the 2020 Tokyo Olympics. Others in attendance included Olympic champion Aliya Mustafina.

Shortly after the conclusion of the Russian Cup Shchekoldina was named to the nominative team for the 2019 World Championships alongside Angelina Melnikova, Daria Spiridonova, Lilia Akhaimova, Anastasia Agafonova, and Angelina Simakova (later replaced by Maria Paseka).  While there she helped Russia win the silver medal behind the United States.

2020
In early February it was announced that Shchekoldina was selected to represent Russia at the Birmingham World Cup taking place in late March.  However the Birmingham World Cup was later canceled due to the COVID-19 pandemic in the United Kingdom.

In November Shchekoldina competed at the Friendship & Solidarity Competition in Tokyo.  She was on the Solidarity Team who won gold.

Competitive History

References

External links 
 Aleksandra Shchekoldina profile on the Russia Artistic Gymnastics Federation website

2002 births
Living people
Gymnasts at the 2019 European Games
Russian female artistic gymnasts
Sportspeople from Surgut
European Games competitors for Russia
Medalists at the World Artistic Gymnastics Championships
21st-century Russian women